Political entities in the 18th century BC – Political entities in the 16th century BC – Political entities by century

This is a list of political entities in the 17th century BC (1700–1601 BC).

Sovereign states

See also
List of Bronze Age states
List of Classical Age states
List of Iron Age states
List of states during late Antiquity
List of state leaders in the 17th century BC

References

Centuries and millennia

-17
17th century BC-related lists